Results of India women's national football team from 2000–2009.

Legend

‡ are unofficial friendly matches after 1994, that are Non FIFA A international matches and are not considered for FIFA rankings.

2001

2003

2005

2007

References

2000